Sloan is an unincorporated community with a population of 105 (as of the U.S. Census 2010) in Clark County, Nevada, situated 18 miles southwest of Las Vegas. It is named for its limestone dolomite carnotite and was first settled in 1912 under the name Ehret; named for the founders' family name, but changed its name to Sloan on September 11, 1922. It is known for its canyon and its Sloan Canyon Petroglyph Site, Petroglyph Canyon, Black Mountain and is mostly located within the North McCullough Wilderness Area and is adjacent to the McCullough Range. It contains well-preserved petroglyphs and several hiking trails that allow visitors to photograph the petroglyphs. Sloan is also home to the George W. Dunaway Army Reserve Center which officially opened in April 2015, which is a large military area not open to the public. 2.7 miles west of Sloan was the site of the Bonanza Air Lines Flight 114 accident, which killed 29 people. Most of the residential areas are located on the main street, Sloan Road, and other smaller roads such as Arville Street, Hinston Street, and Roark Avenue. It is adjacent to Interstate 15 and is accessible from exit 25. The Sloan Canyon visitors center and trailhead to the Petroglyphs are accessible from a newer paved road through the Henderson neighborhood of Anthem, east of Interstate 15.

There are no bus routes from Las Vegas to Sloan.

Sloan Canyon Petroglyph Site
The Sloan Canyon Petroglyph Site is a National Register-listed property located within the Sloan Canyon National Conservation Area, which is a 48,438 acre conservation area in the eastern part of Sloan. It contains more than 1,700 individual design elements that dates back to Archaic times. It also contains geological features such as volcanic rock peaks.
 Its petroglyphs dates thousands of years back and includes carvings and paintings by Indian peoples such as the Ancestral Puebloans, Patayan people, and Southern Paiute people. It was designed a National Conservation Area by the U.S. Congress in 2002, through the passing of the H.R. 5200 - Clark County Conservation of Public Land and Natural Resources Act of 2002.

References

1912 establishments in Nevada
Populated places established in 1912
Populated places in the Mojave Desert
Unincorporated communities in Clark County, Nevada